The Košava 2 is a surface-to-surface missile designed by Military Technical Institute Belgrade publicly presented in 2021. The Košava 2 can be fired from multiple rocket launcher, Oganj LRSVM M18. Košava 2 launch container is similar to ALAS missile containers.

Origin
Košava 2 is further development of Košava rocket bomb launcher developed in 1990's. which used aerial bombs like FAB-100 FAB-250 and FAB-500 that where modified with use of rocket motor to attack ground targets. Two different platforms where developed one based on TAM 150 truck and one based on FAP 2026 truck.

Description
Košava 2 is based on HAB-250 aerial bomb 250kg. In order to increase easy of use Košava 2 is launched from container thus enabling easy refiling of launcher. Accuracy is increased with inertial guidance and TV/IR homing head. After launching wings spread and missiles fly to attitude with rocket engine. After it has reached minimum range and appropriate attitude depending on target range continues flight towards target using lift generated by wings. As it approaches towards target area in its later phase of flight is guided weapon via data-link using TV/IR head for terminal guidance. Using data-link operator can choose and lock on any designated target via TGM and point missile in wished direction. Target can be a heavy fortification, command post or command vehicle, tank, ship, section of bridge or something else that 105kg explosive can damage or destroy. It is on weapons officer to decide target based on orders, battlefield condition, possibilities of system he uses, importance and value of target.

References

Military Technical Institute Belgrade
Surface-to-surface missiles